The Japanese American Committee for Democracy (JACD, Nichibei Minshu Iinkai) was an organization during World War II.

History

The Committee was founded in New York in 1940 as the Committee for Democratic Treatment for Japanese Residents in Eastern States. Its first leader was Issei Reverend Alfred Akamatsu.

Following World War II, the committee received its ultimate title and began organizing public demonstrations of Japanese American loyalty. These demonstrations included war bond rallies, blood drives, and art exhibitions. A number of its members also volunteered for the Foreign Language Division of the Office of War Information as translators or writers.

JACD originally had a mixed Issei-Nisei membership and limited its activities to New York City. However, by the mid-1940s, the JACD had transformed itself into a mass Nisei-based organization that urged political action nationwide. By the end of 1944, all Issei board members were asked to resign.

Despite the organization's apparent focus, its information discussed a variety of topics. The newsletter promoted rallies, cultural and political events and reported on issues such as "Nisei in the Army" and democracy in postwar Japan. The newsletter also contained JACD business sections such as "Membership Meetings," "Community News," and editorials.

Support for internment 
The JACD newsletter stated that most Japanese Americans were loyal, but indicated that the organization remained concerned about the possibility of Fifth columnists. Yoshitaka Takagi, JACD secretary, denounced the internment protesters during the war.

Galen Fisher, of the Committee on National Security and Fair Play, resigned from JACD's advisory board because he disagreed with its "fundamental policy of accepting the evacuation without reservation or right  to criticism."

See also 
 Japanese American Citizens League
 Japanese American National Museum
 Densho: The Japanese American Legacy Project
 Japanese American National Library
 U.S.-Japan Council
 Ayako Ishigaki
 Yasuo Kuniyoshi

References

Further reading

External links
Japanese American Committee for Democracy  From Densho: The Japanese American Legacy Project

Japanese-American history
Organizations established in 1940
1940 establishments in New York City
Organizations based in New York (state)
Japanese Resistance